The Khanate of Khiva ( Khivâ Khânligi,  Khânât-e Khiveh) was a Central Asian polity that existed in the historical region of Khwarezm in Central Asia from 1511 to 1920, except for a period of Afsharid occupation by Nader Shah between 1740 and 1746. Centred in the irrigated plains of the lower Amu Darya, south of the Aral Sea, with the capital in the city of Khiva, the country was ruled by a Turco-Mongol tribe, the Khongirads, who came from Astrakhan. It covered present western Uzbekistan, southwestern Kazakhstan and much of Turkmenistan before Russian arrival at the second half of the 19th century.

In 1873, the Khanate of Khiva was much reduced in size and became a Russian protectorate. The other regional protectorate that lasted until the Revolution was the Emirate of Bukhara. Following the Russian Revolution of 1917, Khiva had a revolution too, and in 1920 the Khanate was replaced by the Khorezm People's Soviet Republic. In 1924, the area was formally incorporated into the Soviet Union and today is largely a part of Karakalpakstan, Xorazm Region in Uzbekistan, and Daşoguz Region of Turkmenistan.

History

Early history
See Khwarazm, the local name of the region.

After 1500

After the capital was moved to Khiva, Khwarazm came to be called the Khanate of Khiva (the state had always referred to itself as Khwarazm, the Khanate of Khiva as a name was popularized by Russian historians in honor of its capital, Khiva). Some time around 1600, the Daryaliq or west branch of the Oxus dried up causing the capital to be moved south to Khiva from Konye-Urgench. Although based in the Oxus delta, the Khanate usually controlled most of what is now Turkmenistan. The population consisted of agriculturalists along the river, the Turkic Sarts, and nomads or semi-nomads away from the river. It is overall arbitrary to anachronistically project modern ethnic and national identifications, largely based on Soviet national delimitation policies, on pre-modern societies. The settled population was composed of aristocrats and peasants bound to the land. During the mid 1600s there were many Persian slaves who had been captured by Turkmens and a few Russian slaves alongside other Turkic slaves. Before and during this period, the settled area was increasingly infiltrated by Uzbeks from the north, with their Turkic dialects evolving into what is now the Uzbek language while the original Iranian Khwarezmian language died out. The swampy area of the lower delta was increasingly populated by Karakalpaks and there were Kazakh nomads on the northern border. The Turkmen nomads paid taxes to the Khan and were a large part of his army but often revolted. Since the heart of the Khanate was surrounded by semi-desert the only easy military approach was along the Oxus. This led to many wars with the Khanate of Bukhara further up the river (1538–40, 1593, 1655, 1656, 1662, 1684, 1689, 1694, 1806, and others).

Before 1505, Khwarazm was nominally dependent on the Timurid Sultan Husayn Mirza Bayqara who was based in Khorasan. From 1488 Muhammad Shaybani built a large but short-lived empire in southern Central Asia, taking Khwarazm in 1505. At nearly the same time, Shah Ismail I was building a powerful Shiite state in Persia. The two necessarily clashed and in 1510 Muhammad was killed and Khwarazm soon occupied. The Shah's religion provoked resistance and in 1511 his garrison was expelled and power passed to Ilbars, who founded the long-lived Arabshahid dynasty.

Around 1540 and 1593, the Khans were driven out by the Bukharans. In both cases they fled to Persia and soon returned. In 1558, Anthony Jenkinson visited Old Urgench and was not impressed. Following Arap Munhammad (1602–23), who moved the capital to Khiva, there was a period of disorder, including an invasion by the Kalmyks, who left laden with plunder. Disorder was ended by Abu al-Ghazi Bahadur (1643–1663) who twice defeated the Kalmyks and wrote a history of Central Asia. His son Anusha (1663–1685) presided over a period of urban growth until he was deposed and blinded. From 1695, Khiva was for some years a vassal of Bukhara which appointed two khans. Shir Gazi Khan (1714–1727), who was killed by slaves, is said to have been the last proper Arabshahid. Khan Ilbars (1728–40) was a Shibanid ruler, son of Shakhniyaz khan who unwisely killed some Persian ambassadors. In a repeat of the Shah Ismail story, Nadir Shah conquered Khiva, beheaded Ilbars and freed some 12,000–20,000 slaves. Next year the Persian garrison was slaughtered, but the rebellion was quickly suppressed. Persian pretensions ended with Nadir's murder in 1747. After 1746, the Qongrat tribe became increasingly powerful and appointed puppet khans. Their power was formalized as the Qongrat dynasty by Iltuzar Khan in 1804. Khiva flourished under Muhammad Rahim Khan (1806–1825) and Allah Quli Khan (1825–1840) and then declined. After Muhammad Amin Khan was killed trying to retake Sarakhs on March 19, 1855, there was a long Turkmen rebellion (1855–1867). In the first two years of the rebellion, two or three Khans were killed by Turkmens.

Russian Empire period
 
Russians made five attacks on Khiva. Around 1602 some free Ural Cossacks unsuccessfully raided Khwarazm. In 1717 Alexander Bekovich-Cherkassky attacked Khiva from the Caspian Sea. After he won the battle, Shir Ghazi Khan (1715–1728) made a treaty and suggested that the Russians disperse so that they could be better fed. After they dispersed they were all killed or enslaved, only a few surviving to tell the tale. In 1801 an army was sent toward Khiva but was recalled when Paul I was murdered. In the Khivan campaign of 1839 Perovsky tried an attack from Orenburg. The weather was unusually cold and he was forced to turn back after losing many men and most of his camels. Khiva was finally conquered by the Khivan campaign of 1873. The Russians installed Sayyid Muhammad Rahim Bahadur Khan II as the vassal ruler of the region.

The conquest of Khiva was part of the Russian conquest of Turkestan. British attempts to deal with this were called the Great Game. One of the reasons for the 1839 attack was the increasing number of Russian slaves held at Khiva. To remove this pretext Britain launched its own effort to free the slaves. Major Todd, the senior British political officer stationed in Herat (in Afghanistan) dispatched Captain James Abbott, disguised as an Afghan, on 24 December 1839, for Khiva. Abbott arrived in late January 1840 and, although the Khan was suspicious of his identity, he succeeded in talking the Khan into allowing him to carry a letter for the Tsar regarding the slaves. He left on 7 March 1840, for Fort Alexandrovsk, and was subsequently betrayed by his guide, robbed, then released when the bandits realized the origin and destination of his letter. His superiors in Herat, not knowing of his fate, sent another officer, Lieutenant Richmond Shakespear, after him. Shakespear had more success than Abbott: he convinced the khan to free all Russian subjects under his control, and also to make the ownership of Russian slaves a crime punishable by death. The freed slaves and Shakespear arrived in Fort Alexandrovsk on 15 August 1840, and Russia lost its primary motive for the conquest of Khiva, for the time being.

A permanent Russian presence on the Aral Sea began in 1848 with the building of Fort Aralsk at the mouth of the Syr Darya. The Empire's military superiority was such that Khiva and the other Central Asian principalities, Bukhara and Kokand, had no chance of repelling the Russian advance, despite years of fighting. In 1873, after Russia conquered the great cities of Tashkent and Samarkand, General Von Kaufman launched an attack on Khiva consisting of 13,000 infantry and cavalry. The city of Khiva fell on 10 June 1873 and, on 12 August 1873, a peace treaty was signed that established Khiva as a quasi-independent Russian protectorate. After the conquest of what is now Turkmenistan (1884) the protectorates of Khiva and Bukhara were surrounded by Russian territory.

The first significant settlement of Europeans in the Khanate was a group of Mennonites who migrated to Khiva in 1882. The German-speaking Mennonites had come from the Volga region and the Molotschna colony under the leadership of Claas Epp Jr. The Mennonites played an important role in modernizing the Khanate in the decades prior to the October Revolution by introducing photography, resulting in the development of Uzbek photography and filmmaking, more efficient methods for cotton harvesting, electrical generators, and other technological innovations.

Civil war and Soviet Republic

After the 1917 Bolshevik seizure of power in the October Revolution, anti-monarchists and Turkmen tribesmen joined forces with the Bolsheviks at the end of 1919 to depose the khan. By early February 1920, the Khivan army under Junaid Khan was completely defeated. On 2 February 1920, Khiva's last Kungrad khan, Sayid Abdullah, abdicated and a short-lived Khorezm People's Soviet Republic (later the Khorezm SSR) was created out of the territory of the old Khanate of Khiva, before it was finally incorporated into the Soviet Union in 1924, with the former khanate divided between the new Turkmen SSR and Uzbek SSR. Following the collapse of the Soviet Union in 1991, these became Turkmenistan and Uzbekistan respectively. Today, the area that was the khanate has a mixed population of Uzbeks, Karakalpaks, Turkmens, and Kazakhs.

Khans of Khiva (1511–1920)

Data on the Khivan Khans is sparse and sometimes contradictory, especially for the minor khans. Names and dates from Bregel/Muniz which probably gives the best modern scholarship. Short biographies are from Howarth's 1880 book which is old but has biographies of most of the khans. RU: is data from the Russian Wikipedia when nothing could be found in English or there was a major contradiction. RU: has sources in local languages.

Arabshahid dynasty (Yadigarid Shibanid dynasty, 1511–1804)
X: According to Howorth, the ancestors of Ilbars were Arabshah, Haji Tuli, Timur Sheikh, Yadigar Khan, Bereke, Ilbars. Arabshah's brother was Ibrahim Oghlan, ancestor of the khans of Bukhara. 
Ilbars I (1511–1518) 1. Enthroned by locals, fought several months to drive the Persians out, brought in Uzbeks in numbers to raid Khorasan.
Sultan Haji (1518–1519) 2. Nephew of Ilbars I, had a short reign; real power in the hands of his cousin Sultan Ghazi.
Hasan Quli (1519–1524, ru:1519) 3. cousin of Ilbar I, killed by Ilbars' sons after 4-month siege of Urganch.
Sufyan (1529–1535, ru:1519–22) 4. 'Sofian Khan', second cousin of Ilbars, fought Turkmens on lower Uzboy River, which then had water.
Bujugha (1524–1529, ru:1522–26) 5. brother of Sufyan, raided Persia, concluded a marriage alliance with Tahmasp I using Sufyan's daughter. Dates from Bregel/Muniz reverse 4 and 5.
Avniq (1535–1538, ru:1526–38) 6. 'Avaneq', brother of Sufyan, blood feud with Ilbars' family and others led to an invasion by Bukhara and his death. Bukharans held Khwarazm until they were driven out by his son, Din Muhammed.
Qal (1539–1549, ru:1541–47) 7. 'Khal Khan', son of Avniq, prosperous reign.
Aqatay (1549–1557, ru:1547–57) 8. 'Akatai', brother of Sufyan, fought the sons of several of his brothers, defeated and impaled.
Dust Muhammad (1557–1558) 9. 'Dost Khan', son of 5, fought his brother Ish and both were killed.
Haji Muhammad I (1558–1602) 10. son of 8, fought Bukhara, which conquered Khiva, 3 years in Persia, regained homeland, driven out, retook it. Visit of Anthony Jenkinson.
Arab Muhammad I (1602–1623, ru:1603–21) 11. son of 10, Ural Cossack raid defeated, two Kalmyk raids, weak, two sons rebelled, blinded, later killed.
Isfandiyar (1623–1643) 12. son of 11, killed his rebellious brothers, pro-Turkmen, anti-Uzbek.
Abu al-Ghazi Bahadur (1643–1663) 13. son of 11, khan after defeating Turkmen-Bukharan faction, fought Bukhara and Kalmyks, wrote the Genealogy of Turkmens, an important historical source.
Anusha (1663–1685) 14. son of 13, took Bukhara and lost it, three more failures at Bukhara, overthrown and blinded by son Erenk.
X: Between Anusha and Sher Gazi (1685–1714) Bregel and Howorth diverge, as do entries in the Russian Wikipedia. Howorth has A. Muhammed Erenk, failed attack on Bukhara, poisoned, B. Shah Niaz (1687-after 1700) appointed by Bukhara, letter to czar in 1700. C. Arab Muhammed, letter from Czar in 1703. D. Haji Muhammed Behadur envoy to czar in 1714, E. Yadiger (−1714), F. Arank, a Karakalpak, father of Shir Gazi.
Khudaydad (1685–1687) ru: 1686–89, son of Anusha, enthroned at 15, killed.
Muhammad Awrang I (1687–1694) ru:1689–94, son of Anusha, killed by fall from horse.
Chuchaq (1694–1697) ru: calls him 'Jochi Khan', descendant of Haji Muhammad I.
Vali (1697–1698)ru: descendant of Haji Mukhammad, could not maintain stability and was removed.
Ishaq Agha Shah Niyaz (1698–1701) ru: son of Jochi/Chuchaq. Howorth has Shah Niyaz appointed by Bukhara in 1687.
Awrang II (1701–1702)
ru only:Shakhbakht Khan (1702–03) son of Shah Niyaz, overthrown.
ru only:Sayyid Ali Khan (1703) son of Shah Niyaz, reign lasted several days.
Musa (1702–1712) ru:1703–04, son of Jochi/Chucaq, fled to Merv.
Yadigar I (1712–1713) ru:1704–14, son of Haji Muhammad I, followed by Sher Ghazi.
Awrang III (c. 1713 – c. 1714).
Haji Muhammad II (c. 1714) envoy to czar in 1714, grandson of Abul Ghazi.
Shir Ghazi (1714–1727) from Bukhara, defeated Alexander Bekovich-Cherkassky, fought rival state on lower delta under Timur Sultan, visited by Florio Beneveni, minor slave rebellion. ru:killed by slaves in same year as Howorth's slave rebellion, descendant of Sultan Gazi (see Sultan Haji).
Sarigh Ayghir (1727)
Ilbars II (1728–1740), son of Shakhniyaz khanrejected threat from Nadir Shah, surrendered to him, executed by Nadir because he had killed Nadir's envoys. Nadir freed many slaves.
Tahir (1740–1742) cousin of Bukharan khan, appointed by Nadir Shah, killed when Nadir's army was elsewhere.
Nurali I (1742) Kazakh, son of Abul Khair Khan, helped expel Nadir's garrison, fled to steppe before Persian army returned. ru: expelled by Persians. 
Abu Muhammad (1742) son of Ilbars, appointed by returning Persians
Abu al-Ghazi II Muhammad (1742–1747) resisted returning Persians?
Ghaib (Kaip Khan) (1747–1758) a Kazakh, enemy of Nurali, driven out, later khan of Little Horde.
X Between Kaip and 1804 Howorth cannot identify khans. He says that they were titular rulers and often exiled after a few years. Real power was in the hands of Inaks or hereditary prime ministers who were also chiefs on the Qungrat tribe in the lower delta. He lists these Inaks: A. Ishmed bi; B. Muhammed Amin (1755–1782) son of A; C. Ivaz, (?–1804), son of B, Dr Blankenagel (1793) could not cure his brother's blindness but left account; D. Iltazar, son of C, after six months expelled last Arabshahid khan. 
Abdullah Qara Beg (1758)
Timur Ghazi (1758–1764)
Tawke (1764–1766)
Shah Ghazi (1766–1768)
Abu al-Ghazi III (1768–1769) ru: son of Kaip, later khan of Karakalpaks, later on lower Syr Darya, died in poverty in 1815.
Nurali II (1769)
Jahangir (1769–1770) ru: son of Kaip.
Bölekey (1770) ru: a Kazakh from lower Syr Darya, expelled above and soon driven out himself.
Aqim (first time, 1770–1771)
Abd al-Aziz (c. 1771)
Artuq Ghazi (c. 1772)
Abdullah (c. 1772)
Aqim (second time, c. 1772 – c. 1773)
Yadigar II (first time, c. 1773–1775)
Abu'l Fayz (1775–1779)
Yadigar II (second time, 1779–1781)
Pulad Ghazi (1781–1783)
Yadigar II (third time, 1783–1790)
Abu al-Ghazi IV (1790–1802) visit of Russian Dr. Blankenagel in 1793.
Abu al-Ghazi V ibn Gha'ib (1802–1804)

Qungrat dynasty (1804–1920)
Qungrat Inaks
Ishmed bi: Howorth only, information from Muraviev who visited in 1820
Muhammed Amin Biy: ru: 1763–1790, slowly restored relative peace, defeated Turkmens in 1770 and Bukhara in 1782.
Avaz or Ivaz: ru: 1790–1804, son of above, relative peace and stability, in 1793 rebellion in lower delta suppressed, but area somewhat independent for about 20 years, in 1793 Russian Dr. Blankenagle was unable to cure his brother's blindness, but left report. According to Howorth, the brother, Fazil bi was 'always consulted' by Avaz and his father. 
Eltuzar (1804): son of above, made himself khan after a few months.
Qungrat Khans

Iltazar Inaq ibn Iwaz Inaq Biy (1804–1806) Inak, exiled last khan, said he would find another, collected army and had himself made khan, attacked Yomuds towards Asterabad, then allied with them, attacked Bukhara, defeated, fled across the Oxus in a boat, so many people piled onto it that it sank and he was drowned.
Muhammad Rahim Bahadur I. (1806–1825) son of above, said to be cruel but strong measures restored order, conquered lower delta (ru:1811), subjugated tribes, fought Persia and Bukhara, visited by Muraviev (1820) who left report. Munis wrote history of Khiva used by Bregel.
Allah Quli Bahadur (1825–1842) son of above, c 1832 took Merv and Serakhs, Alexander Burnes met his army there, 1839 Russian invasion defeated by cold weather, c1840 visited by James Abbott, Richmond Shakespear and Arthur Conolly.
Muhammad Rahim Quli (1842–1846) son of above, fought tribes south of Merv, brother defeated Bukharan invasion.
Abu al-Ghazi Muhammad Amin Bahadur (1846– 19 March 1855) brother of above, took Merv, garrison expelled, retaken, fought Tekes, Russians built forts on the Syr Darya, but Khivans only raided the surrounding areas, campaigned south of Merv, Persians intervened, captured and beheaded because he unwisely pitched his tent on the edge of the camp.
Abdullah (1855) grandson of Ittazar's second son (ru:son of Muhammad Amin), enthroned by defeated army, soon killed by Turkmen rebels.
 (1855–1856) brother of above, fought same rebels, assassinated by rebel ally who pretended to pay homage.
 (1856) Apparently Howorth's Sayid Mahmud, an opium addict who abdicated in favor of his younger brother below.
 (1856 – September 1864) son of second Qungrat khan, civil war, famine and plague, Ignatiev mission(1858), Arminius Vambery's visit (1863).
 (Feruz Khan) (10 September 1864 – September 1910) son of above, conquered by Russia in 1873, Khiva became a Russian protectorate.

Isfandiyar Jurji Bahadur (September 1910 – 1 October 1918) son of the above. Following the Russian Revolution, lost the country to Junaid Khan of the Turkmen Yomut tribe and was executed by him.

Sayid Abdullah (1 October 1918 – 1 February 1920) brother of the above. Real power in hands of Junaid Khan.

See also
Khiva
Khorezm People's Soviet Republic
Khwarazm
List of Sunni dynasties
List of Turkic dynasties and countries

Notes and sources

M Annanepesov and H. N. Bababekov, "The Khanates of Khiva and Kokand", in History of Civilizations in Central Asia, Volume V, pp63–71, 2008
Frederick Burnaby, A Ride to Khiva: Travels and Adventures in Central Asia (1876)
History of the Mongols: From the 9th to the 19th Century, By Sir Henry Hoyle Howorth (biographies of the Khans)

External links
"Russian Invasion (the end of the XIX century)"
"The dramatic end of Khiva"
Map of the Khanates of Bukhara, Khiva, and Khokand and Part of Russian Turkistan from 1875 by Eugene Schuyler
 

 
States and territories established in 1511
States and territories disestablished in 1920
Turkic dynasties
Central Asia in the Russian Empire
Lists of khans
Former Russian protectorates
Former monarchies